Le Buisson is a railway station in Le Buisson-de-Cadouin, Nouvelle-Aquitaine, France. The station is located on the Libourne - Le Buisson and Niversac - Agen railway lines. The station is served by TER (local) services operated by SNCF.

Train services
The following services currently call at Le Buisson:
local service (TER Nouvelle-Aquitaine) Bordeaux - Libourne - Bergerac - Sarlat-la-Canéda
local service (TER Nouvelle-Aquitaine) Périgueux - Le Buisson - Monsempron-Libos - Agen
local service (TER Nouvelle-Aquitaine) Périgueux - Le Buisson - Sarlat-la-Canéda

References

External links
2011 Photo

Railway stations in France opened in 1863
Railway stations in Dordogne